Robert Shelton Royal (born May 15, 1979) is a former American football tight end. He was drafted by the Washington Redskins in the fifth round of the 2002 NFL Draft. He played college football at Louisiana State. He also played for the Buffalo Bills and Cleveland Browns.

Early years
Royal attended Edna Karr High School in New Orleans, Louisiana, where he was a standout in football and basketball. In football, as a senior, he posted ten sacks and 80 tackles.

Professional career

Washington Redskins
Royal was drafted by the Washington Redskins in the fifth round of the 2002 NFL Draft.

Buffalo Bills
Royal signed with the Buffalo Bills as an unrestricted free agent on March 11, 2006. He was released by the Bills on February 26, 2009.

Cleveland Browns
After his release from the Bills, Royal was signed by the Cleveland Browns on March 5, 2009.

The Browns released Royal on February 9, 2011.

References

External links
Buffalo Bills bio
Cleveland Browns bio

Players of American football from New Orleans
American football tight ends
LSU Tigers football players
Washington Redskins players
Buffalo Bills players
Cleveland Browns players
1979 births
Living people